John Moore may refer to:

Arts and entertainment

Art
John Francis Moore (sculptor) (died 1809), see St. Nicolas' Church, North Stoneham
John Collingham Moore (1829–1880), English artist
John Moore (painter) (born 1941), American artist
John Moore (artist), South African artist
John Moore (photographer) (born 1967), American photographer
John Moore of Ipswich, (1821–1902), painter and decorator

Film and theater
John Moore (actor) (late 20th-century), Australian actor in Aboriginal roles
John Moore (stage manager) (1814–1893), British actor, prompter, and stage manager
Jack D. Moore (1906–1998), American set decorator
John Moore (designer) (fl. 1960s), motion picture art director and production designer
John Moore (director) (born 1970), film director, producer, and writer
John Moore (broadcaster) (born 1966), Canadian broadcaster, actor, and voice actor

Music
John Moore (piper) (1834–1894), Irish piper
Deacon John Moore (born 1941), New Orleans musician and bandleader
John Moore (British musician) (born 1964), musician with The Jesus and Mary Chain, Black Box Recorder
John Moore (songwriter) (born 1969), songwriter and singer for the American band 53 Days
John Moore (bluegrass musician), mandolin player
Johnny B. Moore (born 1950), American Chicago blues guitarist, singer and songwriter

Writing
John Moore (Manx poet), privateer and poet from the late 18th Century
John Moore (Scottish physician) (1729–1802), author of the 1789 novel Zeluco and father of General Sir John Moore
John Weeks Moore (1807–1889), editor of musical publications
John Robert Moore (1890–1973), literary critic and student of Daniel Defoe
John Moore (British author) (1907–1967), British author and pioneer conservationist
John Moore (American author) (born 1959), American author
John Francis Moore (writer), comic book writer
John Trotwood Moore (1858–1929), American journalist, writer and local historian

Clergy
John Moore (1595?–1657), English clergyman; authored anti-enclosure pamphlets
John Moore (bishop of Ely) (1646–1714), British scholar
John Moore (Baptist) (1662–1726), English Baptist minister from Northampton
John Moore (archbishop of Canterbury) (1730–1805), Archbishop of Canterbury
John Moore (bishop of St. Augustine) (1835–1901), Bishop of St. Augustine, Florida, 1877–1901
John Moore (Methodist bishop) (1867–1948), Bishop of the Methodist Episcopal Church, South
John Moore (bishop of Bauchi) (1942–2010), Bishop of Bauchi, Nigeria
John Jamison Moore (died 1893), American preacher and educator
John Moore (archdeacon of Cloyne), Archdeacon of Cloyne, 1665–1687

Law and politics

Australia
John Moore (Australian judge) (1915–1998), President of the Australian Conciliation and Arbitration Commission
John Moore (Australian politician) (born 1936), Australian defence minister under John Howard

Canada
John Moore (Lower Canada politician) (died 1858), contractor and political figure in Lower Canada
John Francis Moore (politician) (1816–1870), Canadian politician
John Douglas Moore (1843–1917), Ontario farmer and political figure
John Thomas Moore (1844–1917), member of the Legislative Assembly of Alberta, 1905–1909
John Clarke Moore (1872–1943), Conservative member of the Canadian House of Commons

U.K.
John Moore (MP for Dover) (fl. 1584–1586), MP for Dover
John Moore (regicide) (1599–1650), regicide of King Charles I of England
John Moore (Lord Mayor) (1620–1702), English politician, MP for the City of London, 1685–1687
John Moore, 1st Baron Moore (died 1725), Irish politician
John Moore (1756–1834) (1756–1834), MP who represented the constituency of Newry
John Moore (Irish politician) (1767–1799), President of the Province of Connacht, Irish Republic
John Voce Moore (1826–1904), Lord Mayor of London, 1898–1899
John William Moor (born 1881), British socialist activist
John Moore, Baron Moore of Lower Marsh (1937–2019), British Cabinet minister under Margaret Thatcher

U.S.
John Moore (Louisiana politician) (1788–1867), U.S. Congressman from Louisiana
John Moore (Illinois politician) (1793–1863), Lieutenant Governor of Illinois
John C. Moore (Denver mayor) (1832–1915), American politician
John W. Moore (Missouri politician) (1840–1917), U.S. politician
John P. Moore (Maryland politician) (1856–1918), American politician
John Isaac Moore (1856–1937), acting governor of Arkansas, 1907
John Bassett Moore (1860–1947), U.S. international jurist
John M. Moore (1862–1940), U.S. Congressman from Texas
John William Moore (1877–1941), U.S. Representative from Kentucky
John Moore Allison (1905–1978), United States Ambassador to Japan, Czechoslovakia and Indonesia
John D. J. Moore (1910–1988), United States Ambassador to Ireland, 1969–1975
John J. Moore (1920–1976), New York state senator
John H. Moore II (1927–2013), United States federal judge
John E. Moore (born 1943), Lieutenant Governor of Kansas
John Moore (Mississippi politician) (born 1954), member of the Mississippi House of Representatives
John P. Moore (Mississippi politician) (born 1930), member of the Mississippi State Senate
John Moore (Nevada politician) (born 1964), former member of the Nevada Assembly

Military
Sir John Moore, 1st Baronet (1718–1779), British admiral
John Moore (British Army officer) (1761–1809), British general, a.k.a. Moore of Corunna
John Henry Moore (Texas settler) (1800–1880), settler and officer in the Texas Revolution of 1835–1836
John Creed Moore (1824–1910), U.S. Army officer, Confederate brigadier general
John Moore (physician) (1826–1907), U.S. Army surgeon-general
John Warren Moore (1827–1879), Confederate officer, sheriff and farmer from Mobile, Alabama
John White Moore (1832–1913), U.S. Naval officer
John Anderson Moore (1910–1944), U.S. Naval officer
John Moore (Royal Navy officer) (1921–2010), British Royal Navy submariner and editor of Jane's Fighting Ships

Science
John Howard Moore (1862–1916), American zoologist, philosopher, educator and socialist
John Percy Moore (1869–1965), American zoologist
John Alexander Moore (1915–2002), American biologist
John Fitzallen Moore (1928–2018), American physicist, son of authors Virginia Moore and Louis Untermeyer
John B. Moore (engineer) (1941–2013), Australian electrical engineer
John P. Moore, American virologist
John Wilson Moore (1920–2019), American biophysicist
John Edmund Sharrock Moore, English biologist

Sports

Association football
Jack Moore (sportsman) (1911–?), English footballer, referee and tennis player
John Moore (footballer, born 1923) (1923–2012), English footballer
John Moore (footballer, born February 1943) (1943–2009), Lincoln City F.C. winger/forward
John Moore (footballer, born December 1943), Scottish football player and manager (Luton Town)
John Moore (footballer, born 1945), footballer for Shrewsbury Town, Swansea City and Stoke City
John Moore (footballer, born 1966), English-born Hong Kong international player

Other sports
John Moore (cricketer, born 1891) (1891–1980), Hampshire cricketer
John Moore (baseball), American baseball player of the 1920s
John Moore (rugby league) (died 1942), rugby league footballer of the 1930s and 1940s for England and Bradford Northern
John Doxie Moore (1911–1986), American basketball player and coach
John Moore (skier) (born 1933), British Olympic skier
John Moore (cricketer, born 1943) (1943–2004), former English cricketer
John Moore (referee) (born 1949), Irish hurling referee
John Moore (horseman) (born 1950), Australian racehorse trainer
John Moore (rower) (born 1964), American Olympic rower
John Moore (ice hockey) (born 1990), American ice hockey defenseman

Other
John Bradford Moore (1855–1926), pioneer in the Navajo rug trade
John Chandler Moore (1803–1874), American silversmith
John Coleman Moore (1923–2016), American mathematician
John Franklin Moore (1822–1877), American farmer and developer in North Carolina
John H. Moore (1939–2016), American anthropologist
John Moore (economist) (born 1954), British economist
John Moore (anarchist) (1957–2002), British anarchist and professor
Sir John Moore (civil servant), British civil servant
John Moore (patent), civil complainant about patent relating to his body's cell line
John Godfrey Moore (1847–1899), American businessman, financier and Wall Street stock market promoter
USS John A. Moore (FFG-19), U.S. Navy frigate (1981–2000)

See also
John More (disambiguation)
Johnny Moore (disambiguation)
John Francis Moore (disambiguation)
John Henry Moore (disambiguation)
John Moores (disambiguation)
Jackie Moore (disambiguation)

Moore, John